Einar Tommelstad (19 January 1909 – 7 November 1983) was a Norwegian high jumper. He represented Oslo IL.

At the 1928 Summer Olympics he finished eleventh in the high jump final with a jump of 1.84 metres. He became Norwegian high jump champion in 1928, and also won the Norwegian championships in pentathlon in 1930.

His personal best jump was 1.92 metres, achieved in July 1928 on Bislett stadion.

References

1909 births
1983 deaths
Norwegian male high jumpers
Athletes (track and field) at the 1928 Summer Olympics
Olympic athletes of Norway